The Teberda is a river in the North Caucasus. It is a left tributary of the Kuban. It flows past the Teberda Nature Reserve, through the town Teberda and terminates at Karachayevsk.

References

Rivers of Karachay-Cherkessia